Raymond William "Punker" Hope (19 January 1904 – 24 June 1978) was a New Zealand cricketer who played first-class cricket from 1925 to 1934 and played for New Zealand in the days before New Zealand played Test cricket.

A tall fast bowler, Ray Hope was selected in the New Zealand team to tour Australia in 1925-26 before he had played a first-class match. Several of the originally selected players had had to withdraw, and Hope was the final replacement chosen. His senior cricket had been played for Manawatu. In Manawatu's match against the touring Victorians in 1924-25 he and Norman Gallichan had dismissed the Victorians for 191 to give Manawatu a 14-run first-innings lead. In November 1925, a few days before the team to Australia was finalised, he took 5 for 3 in a club match in Palmerston North.

Hope played in two of the four matches against Australian state teams on the tour, taking three wickets at an average of 84.00. His next first-class matches were for Wellington, one match in 1928-29 and one in 1929-30, again for a total of three wickets. He then played the full Plunket Shield season of three matches for Canterbury in 1933-34, taking three wickets in the first innings of each match, and finishing with 10 wickets at 38.20. In the later part of his career ill-health affected his stamina, and he was more effective in club games than at first-class level.

He also played rugby for Manawatu.

References

External links
Raymond Hope at CricketArchive

1904 births
1978 deaths
New Zealand cricketers
Pre-1930 New Zealand representative cricketers
Canterbury cricketers
Wellington cricketers
Manawatu rugby union players